Pseudopecoeloides is a genus of trematodes in the family Opecoelidae.

Species
Pseudopecoeloides akule Yamaguti, 1970
Pseudopecoeloides arripi Aken'Ova, Cribb & Bray, 2009
Pseudopecoeloides astrocongeris Shen, 1989
Pseudopecoeloides atherinomori Aken'Ova, Cribb & Bray, 2009
Pseudopecoeloides boops Yamaguti, 1970
Pseudopecoeloides capucini Toman, 1992
Pseudopecoeloides carangi (Yamaguti, 1938) Yamaguti, 1940
Pseudopecoeloides chloroscombri (Fischthal & Thomas, 1970) Bartoli, Bray & Gibson, 2003
Pseudopecoeloides dayawanensis Shen & Tong, 1990
Pseudopecoeloides engeleri Rohner & Cribb, 2013
Pseudopecoeloides gracilis Manter, 1947
Pseudopecoeloides hafeezullahi Aken'Ova, Cribb & Bray, 2009
Pseudopecoeloides hickmani Aken'Ova, Cribb & Bray, 2009
Pseudopecoeloides lesteri Aken'Ova, Cribb & Bray, 2009
Pseudopecoeloides mugilis Shen, 1990
Pseudopecoeloides opelu Yamaguti, 1970
Pseudopecoeloides orientalis Gupta & Ahmad, 1978
Pseudopecoeloides parviacetabulatus Yamaguti, 1970
Pseudopecoeloides psettodi Parukhin, 1983
Pseudopecoeloides puriensis Ahmad, 1978
Pseudopecoeloides scomberi Hafeezullah, 1971
Pseudopecoeloides tenuis Yamaguti, 1940
Pseudopecoeloides tenuoides Martin, 1960
Pseudopecoeloides wekeula Yamaguti, 1970

References

Opecoelidae
Plagiorchiida genera
Taxa named by Satyu Yamaguti